Manada Gap is an unincorporated community in East Hanover Township, Dauphin County, Pennsylvania, United States, located in the Harrisburg-Carlisle area, near Fort Indiantown Gap.

Fort Manada
Fort Manada (also known as James Brown's Fort) was a settler stockaded blockhouse established by James Brown in response to Indian attacks in the area, and then
improved and commanded by Captain Frederick Smith as a sub post of Fort Swatara. It stood on what was the property of William Rhoads, east of the Manada Creek, about midway between it and the road to Jonestown and three-quarters of a mile south of the mill that once existed in Manada Gap.

Captain Frederick Smith and his company were mustered into provincial service early in January 1756 and were ordered to establish a defense or occupy and improve the existing defense at Swatara and Manada. The garrison at both forts was spread between the fort and settlers' homes, protecting the dwellings and the workers in the field. James Brown was killed by Indians in August 1756.

As in the case of Fort Hunter, the settlers about Manada Gap had already commenced a place of defense in the latter part of the fall of 1755. In February 1756, Captain Frederick Smith, with his company of provincials, either completed the fort already commenced or erected a new one. This was called Manada Fort.

On historical maps, it is located on the wrong side of the stream and rather too close to the mountain. Being of minor importance, or at least so considered, it was used only a couple of years. The exact location of this fort has never before been given.

Notes

Harrisburg–Carlisle metropolitan statistical area
Unincorporated communities in Dauphin County, Pennsylvania
Unincorporated communities in Pennsylvania